St. Germain is an unincorporated community located in the town of St. Germain, Vilas County, Wisconsin, United States. St. Germain has a post office with ZIP code 54558.

References

Unincorporated communities in Vilas County, Wisconsin
Unincorporated communities in Wisconsin